Michelle Louise Helene Fischbach (born November 3, 1965) is an American attorney and politician who is the U.S. representative from Minnesota's 7th congressional district. The district, which is very rural, is Minnesota's largest congressional district and includes most of the western area of the state. A Republican, Fischbach served as the 49th lieutenant governor of Minnesota under Governor Mark Dayton.

Fischbach was a member of the Minnesota Senate from 1996 to 2018. During her tenure, she was the President of the Minnesota Senate from 2011 to 2013 and from 2017 to 2018. When Dayton appointed Tina Smith to the U.S. Senate after Al Franken’s resignation, Fischbach became the lieutenant governor of Minnesota under the Minnesota Constitution. She served as lieutenant governor from 2018 to 2019.

While serving as the incumbent lieutenant governor of Minnesota, Fischbach was former Governor Tim Pawlenty's nominee for lieutenant governor in the Minnesota Republican Party primary during the 2018 Minnesota gubernatorial election. Pawlenty and Fischbach lost in a contentious primary election.

In the 2020 U.S. House elections, Fischbach defeated 30-year DFLer incumbent Collin Peterson.

As of March 2022, Fischbach is the most recent Republican to hold statewide office in Minnesota.

Early life, education and career
Fischbach grew up in Woodbury, Minnesota. After graduating from Woodbury High School, she attended the College of St. Benedict in St. Joseph from 1984 to 1986; she later transferred to St. Cloud State University, where she graduated with a B.A. in political science and economics in 1989. Fischbach earned her J.D. from William Mitchell School of Law in Saint Paul in 2011.

She first got involved in politics as an intern to Rudy Boschwitz, the incumbent U.S. Senator from Minnesota.

In 1994, Fischbach became the first woman elected to the Paynesville City Council, where she served until she was elected to the Minnesota Senate in 1996.

Minnesota Senate
Fischbach was elected to the Minnesota Senate in 1996 in a special election held after the resignation of DFL Senator Joe Bertram, who had recently pleaded guilty to shoplifting. Fischbach was reelected months later in the 1996 general election, and in 2000, 2002, 2006, 2010, 2012, and 2016. She served as an assistant minority leader from 2001 to 2002 and from 2007 to 2008, and as a deputy minority leader from 2009 to 2010. Fischbach also served as the chair of the Senate's higher education committee.

In 2011, after an election in which Senate Republicans won a majority for the first time since party designation, Fischbach's colleagues elected her the first female president of the Minnesota Senate, a post she held until Republicans lost their majority in 2013. After Republicans regained a majority following the 2016 election, Fischbach was again elected Senate president on January 3, 2017.

Lieutenant governor of Minnesota

Succession 
On December 13, 2017, Governor Mark Dayton appointed his lieutenant governor, Tina Smith, to the U.S. Senate seat of Al Franken, who resigned over allegations of sexual misconduct. Smith resigned to accept the appointment on January 2, 2018. Per Article V of the Minnesota Constitution, as president of the State Senate, Fischbach automatically ascended as lieutenant governor.

Constitutional dispute
 
Fischbach acknowledged that she was now lieutenant governor, but maintained she would retain her Senate seat, calling herself "acting lieutenant governor." The constitutionality of holding two offices at once was disputed. Fischbach noted a memo from the Senate's nonpartisan counsel, which cited an 1898 Minnesota Supreme Court decision as legal precedent for her to hold both offices. She also said the lieutenant governor's duties are largely ceremonial and she would have no difficulty holding both offices. She declined the lieutenant governor's salary, opting to receive only the pay of a state senator. An advisory opinion from state attorney general Lori Swanson disputed the legality of Fischbach's holding both offices at once, citing a 1972 constitutional amendment and other historical precedents.

The potential outcomes were seen as having potentially significant ramifications on Minnesota politics, as Republicans held only a two-vote majority in the state Senate. In December 2017, to avoid a potential tie should Fischbach resign her Senate seat, Senate Majority Leader Paul Gazelka and House Speaker Kurt Daudt sent Dayton a letter requesting a special legislative session to temporarily elect a Democratic president of the Senate. Dayton and legislative Democrats immediately rejected the idea, with Senate Minority Leader Tom Bakk indicating he would file a lawsuit to attempt to force Fischbach out of the Senate should she attempt to serve in both offices, saying the senate's "balance of power [...] will be up for grabs."

In January 2018, a constituent and local DFL activist filed suit against Fischbach, asking a Ramsey County District Court judge to remove her from the state Senate. In February 2018, a judge dismissed the suit, ruling it had been prematurely filed.

On May 25, 2018, Fischbach resigned from the Senate and was sworn in as lieutenant governor.

Campaign
In May 2018, former Republican Governor Tim Pawlenty announced Fischbach as his running mate in his bid for a third term. Pawlenty and Fischbach were defeated in the Republican primary by Jeff Johnson and Donna Bergstrom.

Fischbach was succeeded as lieutenant governor by Democrat Peggy Flanagan, running mate of Tim Walz, who was sworn in on January 7, 2019.

U.S. House of Representatives

Elections

2020 

On September 3, 2019, Fischbach announced her candidacy for the Republican nomination to challenge 30-year incumbent Democrat Collin Peterson in Minnesota's 7th congressional district. She won the five-way Republican primary election. Despite Peterson's incumbency, the 7th had been trending Republican for some time. The Republican presidential nominee had carried the district by double-digit margins in three of the last five elections. This included 2016, when Donald Trump carried it with 62 percent of the vote, his best showing in Minnesota and one of Trump's best performances in a district held by a Democrat.

During her campaign, Fischbach pledged to back Trump on trade, make the 2017 tax cuts permanent, and support workforce education and additional relief for rural and agricultural businesses affected by COVID-19. Her campaign emphasized her support for farmers and the Second Amendment, opposition to abortion, and support for strengthening the U.S. border.

Fischbach defeated Peterson by 49,226 votes, the largest margin of any Republican who defeated an incumbent Democrat in 2020. In that same election, Trump carried the 7th with 64 percent of the vote, his best showing in the state. She and Mariannette Miller-Meeks of Iowa are the only Republican members of Congress to flip Democratic House districts that were not held by Republicans before 2018.

Tenure 
On January 7, 2021, Fischbach was one of 139 representatives to object to the certification of electoral votes from Arizona and Pennsylvania in the 2020 U.S. presidential election, citing allegations of irregularities and voter fraud. On January 13, 2021, she voted against the second impeachment of Trump.

Fischbach, along with all other Senate and House Republicans, voted against the American Rescue Plan Act of 2021.

In September 2021, Fischbach was among 75 House Republicans to vote against the National Defense Authorization Act of 2022, which contains a provision that would require women to be drafted.

Committee assignments 

 Committee on Ways and Means
Subcommittee on Trade
Subcommittee on Oversight
Committee on Rules
Committee on the Budget
Committee on Ethics

Caucus membership 

 Congressional Pro-Life Caucus (Co-Chair)
Congressional Western Caucus
Northern Border Caucus
 Congressional Biofuels Caucus
Republican Study Committee

Personal life 
Fischbach is Roman Catholic. She met her husband, Scott, while working on a campaign for former U.S. Senator Rudy Boschwitz. They started dating while she was attending St. Cloud State University and eventually moved to nearby Paynesville. When Fischbach ran for Congress, she still lived in Paynesville, which is in the far southern section of the district. She and her family have since moved to Regal, near Willmar, firmly in the 7th district. They have two children and several grandchildren.

Fischbach's husband has served as executive director of Minnesota Citizens Concerned for Life since 2001.

Electoral history

2020

2022

See also
List of female lieutenant governors in the United States
Women in the United States House of Representatives

Notes

References

External links

 Representative Michelle Fischbach official U.S. House website

 Michelle Fischbach for Congress
 
 

|-

|-

|-

|-

|-

|-

 -->

1965 births
20th-century American politicians
20th-century American women politicians
21st-century American politicians
21st-century American women politicians
American Roman Catholics
Catholics from Minnesota
Female members of the United States House of Representatives
Lieutenant Governors of Minnesota
Living people
Minnesota city council members
People from Stearns County, Minnesota
People from Woodbury, Minnesota
Presidents of the Minnesota Senate
Republican Party Minnesota state senators
Republican Party members of the United States House of Representatives from Minnesota
Women city councillors in Minnesota
Women state legislators in Minnesota